= Motorized =

Motorized may refer to:

- Motor vehicle
  - especially an automobile
- Motorized military unit—see Armoured warfare
- any item containing a motor
